A DZ Flash is a badge or patch worn by the Airborne forces of the British Army and all squadrons of the RAF Regiment. DZ stands for 'drop zone'. In RAF Regiment use, these flashes distinguish between squadrons, although within the RAF Regiment only II Squadron has a parachute capability.

Joint service units

Army

Current

Inactive

Air Force

Cadet Forces 
Within the Air Training Corps the only cadets permitted to wear a DZ Flash are Qualified Junior Leaders. These cadets wear a blue green DZ.

See also
 Tactical recognition flash

References

British military insignia
British Army equipment
Parachute Regiment (United Kingdom)